Abraham Kattumana (21 January 1944 – 4 April 1995) was an Indian Catholic  Archbishop. He was the Pontifical Delegate of Syro-Malabar Catholic Church with the powers of the Major Archbishop vested in him by Pope John Paul II. Previously, he had served as  apostolic nuncio to Ghana, Benin, and Togo. He was a Vatican diplomat and served at the Nunciatures in Indonesia, Uruguay, Iraq, New Zealand and Great Britain.

Early life and ordination
Abraham Kattumana was born to George Kattumana and Marykutty George Thuruthumaliyil at Thottakam, Vaikom. After completing SSLC he joined the Sacred Heart Minor Seminary of the Archdiocese of Ernakulam on 13 June 1960. He began his philosophy studies at St Joseph's Pontifical Seminary at Alwaye in 1962. After three months he was sent to Rome for continuing the studies. From 1962 to 1969 he studied at the Pontifical Urban University and took master's degree in philosophy and theology. The young Abraham was ordained priest on 3 May 1969 in Rome by Cardinal Joseph Parecattil. Later Fr. Kattumana joined the Pontifical Ecclesiastical Academy, Rome (1969 Batch) where Vatican Diplomats are trained. In the meantime he obtained also a doctorate in Canon Law from Pontifical Urban University, Rome.

Vatican diplomat
On successful completion of the course at the Academy he entered the diplomatic service of the Holy See in 1973. As a Vatican Diplomat he served at the Nunciatures of Indonesia, Uruguay, Iraq, New Zealand and Great Britain.

During his tenure as Pontifical Delegate to the Syro Malabar Catholic Church, the powers of Major Archbishop were vested in him, though the office was held by Mar Antony Padiyara. He died from a massive heart attack during a visit to Rome to submit his observations on the Syro Malabar Church.

Pro-Nuncio to Ghana, Benin & Togo
On 8 May 1991 Fr. Kattumana was elected to the titular see of Cebarades following his appointment as Pro-Nuncio to the African states of Ghana, Benin and Togo and was consecrated bishop on 3 August 1991 at Ernakulam by Cardinal Antony Padiyara.

Pontifical Delegate to the Syro-Malabar Church
In December 1992 Archbishop Kattumana was appointed as Pontifical Delegate to the Syro-Malabar Church when the latter was elevated to Major Archiepiscopal status. Archbishop Kattumana was appointed to "exercise for the duration of his mandate, the functions of pastoral governance proper to the major archbishop." Specifically he had the faculty to convoke and preside over the Synod of Bishops, and to establish the Permanent Synod in the Syro Malabar Catholic Church and the other pastoral and legislative organs of the Church and to invigilate over the functioning of the St Thomas Apostolic Seminary at Vadavathoor, Kottayam.

Death
Archbishop Kattumana had gone to Rome on 30 March 1995 to meet the Pope and the officials of the various Vatican Congregations. While pursuing his mission there he was admitted to the clinic run by the Daughters of St Mary of Leuca in the suburbs of Rome on 3 April afternoon for therapeutic observation, and died of heart failure on 4 April. His body was flown back to Ernakulam on the following day and was buried in St Mary’s Basilica, the Cardinal Church of Syro-Malabar Major Archbishop and Metropolitan of Ernakulam. His tomb is beside that of Cardinal Mar Joseph Parecattil, the late Metropolitan of Ernakulam who ordained Mar Abraham Kattumana to priesthood.

References
 Archdiocese of Ernakulam
 Mar Abraham Kattumana at Catholic hierarchy
 Obituary at Chicago Tribune
  Syro-Malabar Catholic Church becomes a Major Archiepiscopal Church

1944 births
1995 deaths
Malayali people
Christian clergy from Kottayam
Indian diplomats
Apostolic Nuncios to Ghana
Apostolic Nuncios to Benin
Apostolic Nuncios to Togo
Syro-Malabar Catholic Archbishops of Ernakulam-Angamaly
20th-century Eastern Catholic archbishops
People from Vaikom